Bernhard Walther (1430June 19, 1504) was a German merchant, humanist and astronomer based in Nuremberg, Germany.

Walther was born in Memmingen, and was a man of large means, which he devoted to scientific pursuits. When Regiomontanus settled in Nuremberg in 1471, they worked in collaboration to build an observatory and a printing press. After the death of Regiomontanus in 1476 at Rome, Walther bought his instruments, after Hans von Dorn, commissioned by the Hungarian king, had failed to come to an agreement with the council of Nuremberg. Walther continued to observe the planets until his death in Nuremberg. His house, purchased in 1509 by Albrecht Dürer, is today a museum.

Astronomy
Walther amplified on the effects of refraction in altering the apparent location of the heavenly bodies, and substituted Venus for the Moon as a connecting-link between observations of the Sun and stars. As a result, his observations are the most precise prior to those of Tycho Brahe.

His pupil Johannes Schöner made unpublished data of Walther's observations of Mercury available to Nicolaus Copernicus. There were 45 observations in total, 14 of them with longitude and latitude. Copernicus used three of them in "De revolutionibus", giving only longitudes, and erroneously attributed them to Schöner.

These values differed slightly from the ones published by Schöner in 1544 in Observationes XXX annorum a I. Regiomontano et B. Walthero Norimbergae habitae, [4°, Norimb. 1544]., a collection of the astronomical observations of Regiomontanus and Walther, as well as manuscripts of Regiomontanus, which had been in the possession of Walther. In 1618, Willebrord Snell noted them as an appendix to his Observationes Hassiaceae.

Equipment
In 1484 Walther introduced clocks driven by weights, their first use in astronomical determinations. His printing press was used to produce some of the earliest astronomical publications.

Legacy
Walther is the eponym of lunar crater Walther.

Works
Regiomontanus, Johannes: Opera Collectanea. Osnabrück: Otto Zeller 1972 (includes Observations by Bernhard Walther)

References

 This work in turn cites:
J. G. Doppelmayr, Hist. Nachricht von den nürnbergischen Mathematicis, p. 23 (1730)
G. A. Will, Nürnbergisches Gelehrten-Lexikon, vii. 381 (1806)
J. E. Montucla, Hist. des mathematiques, i. 546
J. S. Bailly, Hist. de Paste. moderne, i. 319
E. F. Apelt, Die Reformation der Sternkunde, p. 54
J. P. von Wurzelbaur, Uranies Noricae basis astronomica (1719)
J. F. Weidler, Hist. astronomiae, p. 322
A. G. Kästner, Geschichte der Mathematik, ii. 324
H. Petz, ed., Mitteilungen des Vereins für die Geschichte der Stadt Nürnberger, vii. 237 (1888)
R. Wolf, Gesch. der Astr. pp. 92ff.
Ralf Kern, Wissenschaftliche Instrumente in ihrer Zeit. Vol. 1: Vom Astrolab zum mathematischen Besteck. Cologne, 2010. p. 112.

Further reading
Eirich, Raimund: Bernhard Walther (1430–1504) und seine Familie. Mitteilungen des Vereins für Geschichte der Stadt Nürnberg 74 (1987), pp. 77–128
Gaab, Hans: Ein Zeitgenosse Martin Behaims: Der Kaufmann Bernhard Walther (1430–1504), Liebhaberastronom und Vorbesitzer des Albrecht Dürer-Hauses. Norica 3 (Juli 2007), pp. 69–77
Kremer, Richard L.: Bernhard Walther's Astronomical Observations. Journal for the History of Astronomy 11 (3/1980), pp. 174–191
Kremer, Richard L.: The Use of Bernhard Walther's Astronomical Observations: Theory and Observation in Early Modern Astronomy. Journal for the History of Astronomy 12 (2/1981), pp. 124–132
Kremer, Richard L.: Walther's Solar Observations: A reply to R. R. Newton. Quarterly Journal of the Royal Astronomical Society 24 (1983), pp. 36–47
Newton, Robert R.: An analysis of the solar observations of Regiomontanus and Walther. Quarterly Journal of the Royal Astronomical Society 23 (1982), pp. 67–93
Pilz, Kurt: Bernhard Walther und seine astronomischen Beobachtungsstände. Mitteilungen des Vereins für Geschichte der Stadt Nürnberg 57 (1970), pp. 176–188
Steele, John Michael; Stephenson, Francis Richard: Eclipse Observations by Regiomontanus and Walther. Journal for the history of astronomy 29 (4/1998), pp. 331–344
Zinner, Ernst: Leben und Wirken des Joh. Müller von Königsberg genannt Regiomontanus. 2te verb. Aufl. Osnabrück: Otto Zeller 1968
Johann Christian Poggendorff: Biographisch-literarisches Handwörterbuch der exakten Naturwissenschaften.
Ernst Zinner: Entstehung und Ausbreitung der coppernicanischen Lehre. 2. Aufl. München 1988, 
Hans Gaab: Die große Nürnbergische Uhr. In: Beiträge zur Astronomiegeschichte. 8 (2006), pp. 43–90; Acta Historica Astronomiae, Vol. 28,

External links
https://web.archive.org/web/20070225020810/http://www.naa.net/ain/personen/walther.asp

 Zedlers Universallexikon

1430 births
1504 deaths
People from Memmingen
15th-century German astronomers